The Qʼeqchiʼ language, also spelled Kekchi, Kʼekchiʼ, or Kekchí, is one of the Mayan languages, spoken within Qʼeqchiʼ communities  in Guatemala and Belize.

Distribution

The area where Qʼeqchiʼ is spoken spreads across northern Guatemala into southern Belize. There are also some Qʼeqchiʼ speaking communities in Mexico.

It was calculated that the core of the Qʼeqchiʼ-speaking area in northern Guatemala extends over 24,662 square kilometers (about 9,522 square miles). The departments and specific municipalities where Qʼeqchiʼ is regularly spoken in Guatemala include:

In the country of Belize, Qʼeqchiʼ is spoken in the Toledo District. Qʼeqchiʼ is the first language of many communities in the district, and the majority of Maya in Toledo speak it.

Terrence Kaufman described Qʼeqchiʼ as having two principal dialect groups: the eastern and the western. The eastern group includes the varieties spoken in the municipalities of Lanquín, Chahal, Chahabón and Senahú, and the western group is spoken everywhere else.

Phonology
Below are the Qʼeqchiʼ phonemes, represented with the International Phonetic Alphabet. To see the official alphabet, see the chart in the Orthographies section of this article.

Consonants
Qʼeqchiʼ has 29 consonants, 3 of which were loaned from Spanish.

Vowels
Qʼeqchiʼ has 10 vowels, which differ in quality and also in length.

Prosody

With a few exceptions—interjections, such as uyaluy, and adjectives which have an unstressed clitic on the end—stress always falls on the final syllable.

Grammar 
Like many other Mayan languages, Qʼeqchiʼ is an ergative–absolutive language, which means that the object of a transitive verb is grammatically treated the same way as the subject of an intransitive verb. Individual morphemes and morpheme-by-morpheme glosses in this section are given in IPA, while "full words," or orthographic forms, are given in the Guatemalan Academy of Mayan Languages orthography.

Morphology 
There are two kinds of pronouns in Qʼeqchiʼ: independent pronouns and pronominal affixes. The independent pronouns are much like pronouns in English or Spanish, while the pronominal affixes are attached to words such as nouns, verbs, and statives and used for inflection. Like other Mayan languages, Qʼeqchiʼ has two sets of pronominal affixes, referred to as set A and set B. The following table provides all the pronominal affixes.

When these affixes are attached to transitive verbs, set A affixes indicate the ergative agent while set B indicates the absolutive object.

When a set B affix is attached to an intransitive verb, it indicates the subject of the intransitive verb.

When an affix from set A is prefixed to a noun, it indicates possession. As their name suggests, the prevocalic forms of set A affixes are only found before vowels. However, the rules for the distribution of "preconsonantal" set A prefixes on nouns are more complex, and they can sometimes be found before vowels as well as consonants. For example, loan words (principally from Spanish) are found with preconsonantal affixes, regardless of whether they begin with a consonant or not. In contrast, kinship and body part words—which are words very unlikely to be loaned—always take the prevocalic prefixes if they begin with vowels. The following chart contrasts these two situations.

When an affix of set B serves as the suffix of a stative, it indicates the subject or theme of the stative.

Statives can be derived from nouns. The process simply involves suffixing the set B pronominal affix to the end of the root.

Syntax 
The basic word order of Qʼeqchiʼ sentences is verb – object – subject, or VOS. SVO, VSO, SOV, OVS, and OSV word orders are all possible in Qʼeqchiʼ, but each have a specific use and set of restrictions. The definiteness and animacy of the subject and object can both have effects on the word order. Like many languages, the exact rules for word order in different situations vary from town to town in the Qʼeqchiʼ speaking area.

Orthographies

Several writing systems have been developed for Qʼeqchiʼ, but only two are in widespread use: SIL and ALMG.

Early transcriptions
The first transcriptions of Qʼeqchiʼ in the Latin alphabet were made by Roman Catholic friars in the 16th century. Francisco de la Parra devised additional letters to represent the unfamiliar consonants of Mayan languages, and these were used to write Qʼeqchiʼ. Examples of Qʼeqchiʼ written with the de la Parra transcription can be seen in the 18th century writing of the Berendt-Brinton Linguistic Collection (Rare Book & Manuscript Library, University of Pennsylvania, Ms. Coll. 700). In the 20th century, before Sedat and Eachus & Carlson developed their SIL orthography, field researchers devised alternate Latin transcriptions. For example, Robert Burkitt (an anthropologist fluent in spoken Qʼeqchiʼ and familiar with a range of Qʼeqchiʼ communities and language variation), in his 1902 paper "Notes on the Kekchí Language", uses a transcription based on then-current Americanist standards.

SIL/IIN
A Spanish-style orthography was developed by Summer Institute of Linguistics (SIL) field researchers, principally William Sedat in the 1950s and Francis Eachus and Ruth Carlson in the 1960s. This alphabet was officialized by the Guatemalan Ministry of Education through the Instituto Indigenista Nacional de Guatemala, or the IIN. Although no longer considered standard, this orthography remains in circulation in large part due to the popularity of a few texts including the Protestant Bible produced by the SIL/Wycliffe Bible Translation Project, and a widely used language learning workbook "Aprendamos Kekchí".

ALMG
The Proyecto Lingüístico Francisco Marroquín (PLFM) developed an alternative orthography in the late 1970s, which was influenced by the International Phonetic Alphabet (IPA). Of note, the PLFM orthography used the number "7" to write the glottal plosive, whereas the apostrophe was used in digraphs and trigraphs to write ejective stops and affricates. This system was later modified by the Academia de Lenguas Mayas de Guatemala (ALMG), which replaced the "7" with the apostrophe. The result, the ALMG orthography, has been the standard, official way to write Qʼeqchiʼ, at least in Guatemala, since 1990. In the ALMG orthography, each grapheme (or "letter", including digraphs and trigraphs) is meant to correspond to a particular phoneme. These include separate vowels for long and short sounds, as well as the use of apostrophes (saltillos) for writing ejectives and the glottal stop. The following table matches each of the official ALMG graphemes with their IPA equivalents.

Comparison of the two major orthographies

History 
At the time of the Spanish conquest of the Americas, Qʼeqchiʼ was probably spoken by fewer people than neighboring languages such as Itzaʼ, Mopan, and Choltiʼ, all of which are now moribund or extinct. The main evidence for this fact is not colonial documents, but the prevalence of loan words apparently stemming from these languages in Qʼeqchiʼ. However, a number of factors made Qʼeqchiʼ do better than the just-mentioned languages. One is the difficult mountainous terrain which is its home. Another is that, rather than simply being conquered, as the Choltiʼ, or resisting conquest for an extended period, as the Itzaʼ did for over 200 years, the Qʼeqchiʼ came to a particular arrangement with the Spaniards, by which Dominican priests, led initially by Fray Bartolome de las Casas, were allowed to enter their territory and proselytize undisturbed, whereas no lay Spaniards were admitted. This led to their territory being renamed "Verapaz" (true peace) by the Spaniards, a name which continues today in the Guatemalan departments Alta Verapaz and Baja Verapaz. This relatively favorable early development allowed the people to spread, and even make war on neighboring Mayan groups. Although it was later followed by the brutal policies of the late-19th-century liberals and the late-20th century military governments, it largely explains the status of Qʼeqchiʼ as the 3rd largest Mayan language in Guatemala and the 4th across the Mayan region. The relatively recent, postcolonial expansion is also the reason that Qʼeqchiʼ is perhaps the most homogeneous of the larger Mayan languages.

Qʼeqchi is taught in public schools through Guatemala's intercultural bilingual education programs.

Texts
Like most other Mayan languages, Qʼeqchiʼ is still in the process of becoming a written and literary language. Existing texts can roughly be divided into the following categories.

 Educational texts meant to teach people how to speak, read or write Qʼeqchiʼ. This category includes materials such as dictionaries and grammars, as well as workbooks designed to be used in rural Guatemala schools in communities where the majority of the people are native speakers of Qʼeqchiʼ.
 Religious texts. The Protestant version of the Bible (published by the SIL based on the work of William Sedat, and Eachus and Carlson) mentioned above is probably the most widely available text in Qʼeqchiʼ. In the last twenty years or so, the Roman Catholic Church has been one of the primary proponents of written Qʼeqchiʼ. Various Catholic organizations are responsible for producing a number of texts, including the New Testament, Genesis and Exodus, and various instructional pamphlets. A songbook entitled Qanimaaq Xloqʼal li Qaawaʼ 'We praise the Lord' is very popular among Catholics, has been in print for many years, and is updated with new songs regularly.  The Book of Mormon also is available in Qʼeqchiʼ as are also other LDS religious texts.
 Non-instructive secular texts have also begun to appear in the last ten years or so, although they are still few in number. The most ambitious of these works have been a free translation of the Kʼicheʼ text Popol Wuj ("Popol Vuh") by the Qʼeqchiʼ language teacher and translator Rigoberto Baq Qaal (or Baʼq Qʼaal), and a collection of Qʼeqchiʼ folk tales. A number of government documents have also been translated into Qʼeqchiʼ, including the Guatemalan Constitution.

External links
 KʼEQCHI' 2012, 2021 Maya Atinab'aal re li Poyanam Kʼeqchi' sa' eb' li Tenamit Guatemala ut Belize / Mayan language for the Kʼeqchi' people in Guatemala and Belize
 Qʼeqchiʼ Vocabulary List (from the World Loanword Database)
 Comparative Qʼeqchiʼ Swadesh vocabulary list (from Wiktionary)
 Web page of the Spanish language Qʼeqchiʼ learning book Aprendamos kekchí at the SIL. On this site, there is a link to download the book as a PDF. Retrieved May 8, 2016.

Bibliography

Grammars of Qʼeqchiʼ

 This is a pedagogical grammar, rather than a descriptive grammar like the majority in this section.
 This grammar does not include syntax. The area of study for the book was Cobán and the surrounding towns of San Pedro Carchá, San Juan Chamelco, and Chamil.

 This is a normative grammar, rather than a descriptive grammar like the majority in this section.

Articles on Qʼeqchiʼ

Dictionaries of Qʼeqchiʼ

References

Agglutinative languages
Mayan languages
Mesoamerican languages
Languages of Guatemala
Alta Verapaz Department
Baja Verapaz Department
Izabal Department
Petén Department
Quiché Department
Languages of Belize
Toledo District
Languages of El Salvador